Michael Mosley may refer to:

Michael Mosley (actor) (born 1978), American television and film actor
Michael Mosley (broadcaster) (born 1957), British journalist and TV presenter, former doctor
Mike Mosley (1946–1984), American racecar driver
Mike Mosley (American football) (born 1958), former American football wide receiver

See also
Michael Moseley (disambiguation)